Tiago Pagnussat (born 17 June 1990) is a Brazilian professional footballer who plays as a centre back for Ceará.

Club career
Born in São Jorge d'Oeste, Paraná, Tiago graduated from Criciúma's youth setup, but failed to appear in any official matches for the club. In July 2011 he moved to Vila Aurora, appearing sparingly in Série D.

On 24 August 2011 Tiago joined Caxias. Initially a backup, he appeared in 14 matches during the campaign, scoring two goals.

In January 2013 Tiago signed an 18-month deal with Guarani. Despite being a starter in the year's Campeonato Paulista (which the club finished dead last), he rescinded his link in May, and eventually returned to Caxias.

In August 2014, after impressing with the latter in both Campeonato Gaúcho and Série C, Tiago signed a four-year deal with Série A side Atlético Mineiro. He made his debut in the competition on 25 October, netting his side's first through a direct free kick in a 3–2 home win against Sport Recife.

Honours
Caxias
Campeonato Gaúcho: 2012 Runner-up

Atlético Mineiro
Copa do Brasil: 2014
Campeonato Mineiro: 2015

Bahia
Copa do Nordeste: 2017

Ceará
Copa do Nordeste: 2020

References

External links
Atlético official profile 
Meu Time na Rede profile 
Profile at Cerezo Osaka

1990 births
Living people
Sportspeople from Paraná (state)
Brazilian footballers
Brazilian expatriate footballers
Expatriate footballers in Argentina
Association football defenders
Argentine Primera División players
Campeonato Brasileiro Série A players
Campeonato Brasileiro Série B players
Campeonato Brasileiro Série C players
Campeonato Brasileiro Série D players
Criciúma Esporte Clube players
Sociedade Esportiva e Recreativa Caxias do Sul players
Guarani FC players
Clube Atlético Mineiro players
Esporte Clube Bahia players
Club Atlético Lanús footballers
Ceará Sporting Club players
Cerezo Osaka players
Nagoya Grampus players
J1 League players
Brazilian expatriate sportspeople in Japan
Expatriate footballers in Japan